Henry Frederick Peace (10 July 1913 – 11 September 1987) was a Canadian wrestler. He competed in the men's freestyle welterweight at the 1948 Summer Olympics.

References

External links
 

1913 births
1987 deaths
Canadian male sport wrestlers
Olympic wrestlers of Canada
Wrestlers at the 1948 Summer Olympics
Place of birth missing